Anton Nikolaevich Shkaplerov (born 20 February 1972) is a former Russian cosmonaut. He is a veteran of four spaceflights.

Personal life 
Shkaplerov is married to Tatyana Petrovna, and they have two daughters named Kristina and Kira. His parents, Nikolay Ivanovich Shkaplerov and Tamara Viktorovna Shkaplerova, live in Sevastopol. His hobbies include sports, travel, fishing, and golf.

Education 
Shkaplerov completed Yak-52 flight training at the Sevastopol Aviation Club in 1989. After graduation from Sevastopol High School in 1989, he entered the Kachinsk Air Force Pilot School graduating in 1994 as pilot-engineer. In 1997, he graduated from the N. E. Zukovskiy Air Force Engineering.

Experience 
After graduation Shkaplerov served as a senior pilot-instructor in the Russian Air Force. He has piloted Yak-52, L-29 and MiG-29 aircraft. He is a Class 2 Air Force pilot-instructor. He is also an Instructor of General Parachute Training, and has performed more than 300 parachute jumps.

Roscosmos career 

In May 2003, Shkaplerov was selected as a test-cosmonaut candidate of the Gagarin Cosmonaut Training Center Cosmonaut Office. From June 2003 to June 2005, he attended basic space training and was qualified as a test cosmonaut in 2005.

From April–October 2007, Shkaplerov served as Director of Operations, Russian Space Agency, stationed at the Johnson Space Center in Houston, Texas.

Anton was assigned as the back-up commander for Expedition 22.

Expedition 29/30
Shkaplerov served as a Flight Engineer for Expedition 29/30 aboard the ISS. He was the Commander of Soyuz TMA-22 and launched with flight engineers Anatoli Ivanishin and Dan Burbank on November 16, 2011. After 2 days in orbit they docked with the ISS, to begin Expedition 29/30. On February 12, 2012, Shkaplerov and fellow cosmonaut Oleg Kononenko conducted a six-hour spacewalk outside the ISS. They installed shields on the Zvezda Service Module to protect it from micrometeoroid orbital debris and move the Strela 1 crane from the Pirs docking compartment to the Poisk Mini Research Module (MRM-2). The duration was 6 hours 15 minutes. They spent 165 days in space before undocking and returning to Earth on April 27, 2012.

Expedition 42/43
 
On November 23, 2014, Shkaplerov commanded Soyuz TMA-15M alongside Flight engineers Samantha Cristoforetti and Terry Virts from the Baikonur Cosmodrome. It successfully docked at the International Space Station roughly six hours later and the crew joined the Expedition 42 crew which consisted of Commander Barry Wilmore and Flight Engineers Aleksandr Samokutyayev and Yelena Serova. The crew spent 199 days in space before returning to Earth on June 11, 2015. Shkaplerov's total time in space was brought to 365 days.

Expedition 54/55
Shkaplerov was launched on into space on board Soyuz MS-07 on 17 December 2017 07:21 UTC, with NASA astronaut Scott Tingle and Norishige Kanai of JAXA. He was the flight engineer of Expedition 54 and commander of Expedition 55.

On February 2, 2018, Shkaplerov along with Expedition 54 Commander Alexander Misurkin participated in an 8-hour 13 minutes spacewalk outside of the ISS to replace an old electronics box for a high-gain communications antenna. At completion, the two cosmonauts set a new record for the longest Russian spacewalk to date.

Expedition 65/66
Shkaplerov flew to the ISS on board Soyuz MS-19 on 5 October 2021 08:55 UTC together with film director Klim Shipenko and actress Yulia Peresild. On November 6 Shkaperlov became ISS commander as part of Expedition 66.

On 19 January 2022, he participated in an 7-hour 11 minutes spacewalk to configure the Prichal module to support visiting Soyuz and Progress vehicles.

Shkaplerov landed on 30 March 2022, with Russian cosmonaut Pyotr Dubrov and American astronaut Mark Vande Hei.

Statistics

Cinematography
On May 14, 2021, the Interagency Committee approved the composition of the ISS main and alternate crews for the period 2021-2023. Cosmonaut Anton Shkaplerov (commander) and the crew of the film The Challenge: actress Yulia Peresild and director Klim Shipenko, launched to the ISS on Soyuz MS-19. The drama is a joint project of Roscosmos, Channel One and the Yellow, Black and White studio. The alternates chosen after passing the medical committee are: New Drama Theater actress Alyona Mordovina, director Alexey Dudin and commander Oleg Artemyev. Beginning May 24 the crew members trained at the Yuri Gagarin Cosmonaut Training Center. On July 23, the prime crew participated in a four-hour simulation inside a Soyuz replica while wearing the Sokol suit and on July 30, the spacecraft had its pre-launch preparation started.

Shipenko and Peresild returned to Earth on October 17, 2021 on Soyuz MS-18, with Commander Oleg Novitskiy. Cosmonaut Pyotr Dubrov and astronaut Mark Vande Hei, who arrived at the ISS on Soyuz MS-18, will join Shkaplerov on the landing of Soyuz MS-19, with Shkaplerov serving as commander of Expeditions 66 and 67. Soyuz MS-19 is scheduled to land on March 28, 2022.

Reactions
The film, which according to Dmitry Rogozin, head of Roscosmos, is an "experiment to see if Roscosmos can prepare two ordinary people to fly in about 3 or 4 months" has received opposition from the scientific and aerospace communities, as to the fact that they remove trained cosmonauts from their flights, a misuse of public money, or even that using the station's resources for non-scientific purposes would be illegal. Sergei Krikalev, director of crewed programs at Roscosmos, reportedly lost his position by speaking out against the project, but was reinstalled after a few days following protests from cosmonauts on and off active duty.

Movie portion to be shot on ISS
Klim Shipenko will have to shoot about 35-40 minutes of film on the ISS, as well as taking on the position of director, operator, art director, and makeup artist. Oleg Novitsky and Peter Dubrov will appear in the film, with Dubrov and Mark Vande Hei assisting in the production. Shkaplerov will appear in some scenes of the movie.

See also
A Beautiful Planet - 2016 IMAX documentary film showing scenes of Earth which features Anton Shkaplerov and other ISS crew members.

References

External links

 Spacefacts Biography
 
 

1972 births
Living people
Commanders of the International Space Station
People from Sevastopol
Russian cosmonauts
Heroes of the Russian Federation
Spacewalkers